Age of Aquarius or The Age of Aquarius may refer to:

Age of Aquarius, the current or forthcoming astrological age
Age of Aquarius (album), by Revolution Renaissance, 2009, and the title track
The Age of Aquarius (album), by The 5th Dimension, 1969
"Aquarius" (song), or "The Age of Aquarius", a song from the 1967 musical Hair
Aquarius/Let the Sunshine In, a medley of two songs by The 5th Dimension, 1969

See also
Aquarius (disambiguation)
Aquarian Age (disambiguation)
Hair (musical)
Hair (film)